South Conway County School District  is a public school district in southern Conway County, Arkansas with its headquarters in Morrilton, the county seat.

The district encompasses  of land in Conway County, and serves the municipalities of Morrilton, Menifee, Oppelo, and Plumerville. It also serves the unincorporated areas of Solgohachia, and Springfield.

History
In 1980 the East Side, Morrilton, and Plumerville School districts consolidated to form the new South Conway County district.

In 1974 the Conway County School District dissolved, with the Morrilton school district receiving a portion of it.

Schools

Secondary education 
 Morrilton High School, serving grades 9 through 12.
 Morrilton Junior High School, serving grades 7 through 9.
 River Valley Technical Center, serving grades 10 through 12.

River Valley Technical Center 
River Valley Technical Center is a secondary area technical center designed to allow young people to receive skill training while they are still in high school. The Center serves students in the 10th, 11th and 12th grades from Morrilton, Nemo Vista, Perryville, and Wonderview High Schools
 
Students receive credit to be applied to their graduation requirements by their home school, and may also earn college credit at University of Arkansas Community College at Morrilton or Arkansas State University-Beebe. There is no cost to the student. Tuition is paid by the student's home school.
 
The Center offers the following programs:
 
 Automotive Collision Repair
 Automotive Service Technology
 Construction Technology
 Cosmetology
 Drafting & Design
 Medical Professions Education
 Petroleum Technology

Early childhood and elementary education 
 Morrilton Intermediate School, serving grades 4 through 6.
 Morrilton Elementary School, serving grades 2 and 3.
 Morrilton Primary School, serving prekindergarten through grade 2.

References

Further reading
 (Download) - Includes maps of predecessor districts

External links
 

Education in Conway County, Arkansas
School districts in Arkansas
1980 establishments in Arkansas
School districts established in 1980